Kirios Ma... Kai Alitis (Greek: Κύριος Μα... Και Αλήτης; English: Main But... Also A Bum) is the fortieth studio album by Greek singer Vasilis Karras.

It was released on 8 September 2013 as a covermount with Greek newspaper, Real News, and from 9 September 2013 to all music stores by The Spicy Effect, in Greece. The album was recorded in Athens and Thessaloniki and was the fourth time that Vasilis collaborate with Phoebus. It received sevenfold platinum certification, selling 73,400 units with the newspaper's release and over 84,000 units overall.

Track listing

Credits

Personnel 
Alexandros Arkadopoulos: clarinet (tracks: 2)

Giorgos Atmatsidis: lyre (tracks: 9)

Romeos Avlastimidis: violin (tracks: 2)

Eleanna Azouki: backing vocals (tracks: 9)

Christos Bousdoukos: violin (tracks: 5)

Giorgos Chatzopoulos: guitars (tracks: 1, 2, 3, 4, 5, 6, 7, 8, 9, 10, 11)

Akis Diximos: second vocal || backing vocals (tracks: 3, 9)

Kostas Doxas: backing vocals (tracks: 9)

Charis Galanis: backing vocals (tracks: 3, 9)

Vahan Galstyan: clarinet, duduk (tracks: 8)

Antonis Gounaris: guitars, keyboards, orchestration, programming (tracks: 12)

Telis Kafkas: bass (tracks: 1, 2, 4, 5, 6, 8, 9)

Vasilis Nikolopoulos: drums (tracks: 1, 2, 4, 6, 8, 9) || keyboards, orchestration, programming (tracks: 1, 2, 3, 4, 5, 6, 7, 8, 9, 10, 11)

Thimios Papadopoulos: flute (tracks: 4)

Thanasis Petrelis: baglama (tracks: 7, 9, 10) || bouzouki (tracks: 5, 6, 7, 8, 9, 10, 11) || säz (tracks: 6, 8, 11) || tzoura (tracks: 5, 7, 8, 9, 10, 11)

Phoebus: keyboards (tracks: 2, 9) || orchestration (tracks: 1, 2, 4, 5, 6, 8, 9, 11) || programming (tracks: 9)

Stefania Rizou: backing vocals (tracks: 9)

Giorgos Roilos: percussion (tracks: 2, 11)

Production 
Giannis Gkiouras (New Sound studio): sound engineer [vocals] (tracks: 4, 5, 6, 7, 8, 9, 10, 11)

Vasilis Nikolopoulos (Power Music studio): mix engineer

Phoebus: executive producer, mix engineer

Vaggelis Siapatis (Power Music studio): coordinatior, editing, sound engineer

Paul Stefanidis (Viking Lounge studio): mastering

Cover 
Manolis Chiotis: photographer [back cover]

Kostas Gkoras: photographer [booklet, front cover]

You And I: art direction

Notes
The vocals at tracks 1, 2, 3 and 12 were recorded at Power Music Studio.
The vocals at tracks 4, 5, 6, 7, 8, 9, 10 and 11 were recorded at Studio New Sound, a Giannis Gkiouras's studio at Thessaloniki.
The drums were recorded at Studio Sierra.

Credits adapted from the album's liner notes.

Chart performance 
Kirios Ma... Kai Alitis, after a month on the charts, it was certified 7×Platinum by IFPI.

References 

2013 albums
The Spicy Effect albums